Ylljet Aliçka is an Albanian writer and scriptwriter, mostly known as the author of the novel The Stone Slogans, (film Slogans) and the controversial novel A Story With Internationals, which satirizes the diplomatic elite accredited in transition countries.

Biography 
Ylljet Aliçka was born and lives in Tirana, Albania.

Academic career:
1969-1973: Natural science's studies, Tirana University
1991: Doctor: didactic sciences
2016: Professor Doctor

Professional career:
1973-1981, a schoolmaster in Mat region, Albania
1981-1992, Publishing house of schoolbooks, Tirana
1992-1997, Head of International relations, Ministry of Culture, Tirana, Albanian representant to CDDC-Council of Europe
1998-2007, Communication officer, Delegation of the European Commission, Tirana
2007-2013, Ambassador of Albania, in France, Monaco, Portugal, Algeria, UNESCO. The personal representative of the President of Republic at Agence International de la Francophonie.
2014-2019, Albanian representant at Eurimage (Council of Europe)
2013-2020, Professor at European University of Tirana
2020....Albanian Mediterranean University  and University of Arts.

Literary publications

In Albania 

Tregime (1998) Onufri 
Kompromisi (2001) Onufri 
Rrëfenje me ndërkombëtarë (2006) OMSCA 
Parrullat me gurë (2007) Toena 
Rrëfenje me ndërkombëtarë (2008) Toena 
Koha e puthjeve (2009) Toena 
Valsi i lumturisë (2012) Toena 
Metamorfoza e nje kryeqyteti (2019) Onufri

Abroad 

Les slogans de pierre (1999) Edition Climates; France 
Kompromis (2001) Publishing House Pogranicze, Poland
 Balkan blood, Balkan beauty (2006) North-western University Press, U.S.
I compagni di pietra (2006) Guaraldi, Italy
Albanien(2008), Edition Temmen, Germany 
Les slogans de pierre (2009) Edition Pyramidion, France 
Les étrangères (2010) Edition Pyramidion, France
La sloganoj el stonoj (2013) Esperanto, Swidnik, Poland  
Když projížděl Chruščov naší vesnicí (2015) Petr Štengl Edition, Czech Republic 
Un sogno italiano (2016) Rubbettino editore, Italy 
Mappe 12 fra Tirana (2017) Bokvennen Forlag, Norway 
Internationals (2017) Tirana times, Albania 
Nouvelles d'avant (2018) Edition Pyramidion, France 
La valse du bonheur (2019) L'Esprit du temps, France 
Gli internazionali (2019) Rubbettino editore, Italy 
Internationals (2020) Degarandishan Publishing House; Iran
Steinerne parolen(2020) Monda assembleo socia, Cuba-Germany,
Les etrangeres(2021), Editions des 60, France
La metamorphose d'une capitale(2021), Editions des 60 France
La metamorfosi di una capitale(2021), Castelvechi editore Italy

Screenplays 

Slogans (2001)  French-Albanian film, based on the book Les slogans de pierre
An Albanian chronicle (2008) French-Italian-Albanian film based on the book The Compromise
 An Expat's tale(2018) Art film, based on the novel "Internationals" 
The poet(2019)Teo film, based on short story "The poet" 
Profesionist(2020) Bunker film, based on the short story "Stone slogans"

Prizes:
in literature

1999  - First prize, International competition of short stories, Teramo, Italy 
2000  - Second prize, International competition Art e letters de France, Bordeaux, France 
2001  - Silver medal in prose by the Albanian Ministry of Culture, Tirana, Albania
2002  - Prix de la francophonie, Albanian Ministry of Foreign Affairs, Tirana, Albania 
2009  - Special prize, VII Premio Letterario Nazionale, Rome, Italy
2012  - Silver medal in prose for Valsi i lumturisë by the Albanian Ministry of Culture, Tirana, Albania 

in cinematography:

2001  - Slogans Young critics award, Festival de Cannes, Cannes, France 
2006  - Slogans, Best screenplay, Albanian Film Festival by the Ministry of Culture,
2011  - Një histori provinciale, Best screenplay, South-East European Film Festival, Paris, France 
2016  - "Plastic flowers", Winner-Hollywood International Moving Pictures Film Festival (HIMPFF),
2018  - "Plastic flowers"Best screenplay, Korça Short Film Fest 

Memberships: 
 Founder member Fondazione Fabrizio De Andre Milano, Itali
 Honoured citizenship La Republique De Montmartre, Paris, 2011
 Member of French Academy Berry- Georges Sand, Paris 2010 
 Member of Francophone writers association, Paris, 2012
 Member of audiovisual and dramatic authors, SACD, Paris, 2006

References 

Albanian male writers
20th-century Albanian writers
21st-century Albanian writers
Living people
1951 births
People from Tirana
Ambassadors of Albania to France
Permanent Delegates of Albania to UNESCO
Ambassadors of Albania to Morocco
Ambassadors of Albania to Portugal
Ambassadors of Albania to Monaco
University of Tirana alumni
Academic staff of the University of Tirana